Kurmann is a Swiss surname that may refer to
Anita Kurmann (1976–2015), Swiss endocrinologist and thyroid surgeon
Danny Kurmann (born 1966), Swiss ice hockey referee 
Fridolin Kurmann (1912–?), Swiss field hockey player 
Xaver Kurmann (born 1948), Swiss cyclist 

German-language surnames